Annihilate 'em (April 11, 1970 – November 20, 1989) was a U.S. thoroughbred race horse who was best known for winning the 1973 Travers Stakes at Saratoga Race Course in Saratoga Springs, New York.  Annihilate 'em was ridden to victory in the Travers by Ron Turcotte, who originally planned to ride Triple Crown winner Secretariat in the race. However, Secretariat missed the race due to poor health after losing the Whitney Stakes to Onion two weeks earlier while running with a low-grade fever.  Annihilate 'Em and Secretariat met in their only race together in the Marlboro Cup Invitational Handicap in September 1973, where Secretariat finished first and Annihilate 'Em finished fifth.

Annihilate 'Em's other stakes victories included the 1972 Breeders' Futurity, the 1973 Minuteman Handicap and the 1973 Sentinel Stakes.

Retired to stud, Annihilate 'em stood his entire career at High Hope Farm in Versailles, Kentucky.

Pedigree

References

1970 racehorse births
1989 racehorse deaths
Racehorses bred in Kentucky
Racehorses trained in the United States
Thoroughbred family A10